A Brake Standard Open or BSO, is a type of railway carriage used by British Rail. Both Mark 1 and Mark 2 types were built. Each consists of a standard class open passenger saloon with a centre aisle, a guard's compartment with hand brake and a lockable luggage compartment.

A number of Mark 1 and Mark 2 BSOs were converted to Brake Standard Open (Micro-Buffet) (BSOT), and fourteen Mark 2 BSOs were converted to Driving Brake Standard Open (DBSO). A number of BSO and BSOT coaches have been preserved, and some are still in use on main line charters. One significant survivor is No. 9267, the last surviving coach in the final excursion train on the Somerset & Dorset line on 6 March 1966, which is appropriately located at Midsomer Norton.

Orders

See also 
 Open coach

References

British Rail coaching stock